The 6th The Beatz Awards, was held at Muson Center in Lagos on 28 November 2021. The organizers opened a portal for the public, to submit entries on 4 August 2021, and recorded 2500 entries, on October 6. Nominees were revealed on October 29, 2021. The live show was televised on STV, Nigezie TV, wapTV, TVC, BEN Television, and MTV Base, and hosted by Victory Wilson, Boda Wasiu, and Saco. It celebrated entertainment personalities across 25 voting categories, with 3 honorary Awards (non-voting).

The CEO of The Beatz Awards, Elijah John, stated: "one of the sponsors, Pazino Homes and Gardens, will be awarding a landed property to the winner of the OAP category, as the Awards have taken on new dimensions". He further stated: "all producer categories, mixing, and mastering categories will each receive a monetary reward of one hundred thousand naira (₦100,000)".

On 30 December 2020, the organizer held a virtual pre-ceremony of the 6th edition, tagged: "THE BEATZ AWARDS 20 FOR 20", reviewing the 20 biggest songs in the year 2020. The category New Discovery Producer was renamed Don Jazzy New Discovery Producer. The category was won by Andre Vibez, with a million naira cash price awarded to him, and the runner-up, Ajimovoix Drums.

Performers

Presenters
Victory Wilson
Boda Wasiu
Saco
Don Jazzy -  presented the award for Don Jazzy New Discovery Producer of the Year

Nominations and winners
The following is a list of nominees and the winners are listed highlighted in boldface.

Special recognition awards
At the ceremony, the organizers gave a Special Recognition Award to Seyi Tinubu, Kaffy, and Harrysong.

References 

2021 music awards
2021 awards